State Route 46 (SR 46) is a north–south state highway in the northeastern portion of the U.S. state of Ohio.  Its southern terminus is at State Route 170 in East Palestine (this point is also the eastern terminus of State Route 558), and its northern terminus is at State Route 11 several miles south of State Route 531 in Plymouth Township.  In its northernmost portion, from south of Ashtabula to Cortland, Route 46 is a 2-lane highway while running parallel within a few miles to limited-access State Route 11 to the east.

History

1923 – Original route established; originally routed from Canfield to the former State Route 2 (current U.S. Route 20) in Ashtabula.
1931 – Extended to Columbiana along a previously unnumbered road.
1938 – Extended to State Route 531 in Ashtabula along a previously unnumbered road.
1946 – Extended to East Palestine along its current route and State Route 558.
1956 – Columbiana to Canfield dually certified with State Route 14.
2007-08-17 - Removed from State Route 11, truncated at State Route 11 interchange in Plymouth Township.

Major intersections

References

046
Transportation in Columbiana County, Ohio
Transportation in Mahoning County, Ohio
Transportation in Trumbull County, Ohio
Transportation in Ashtabula County, Ohio